Dragutin Babić (5 November 1897 – 17 May 1945) was a Croatian footballer who represented the national team of the Kingdom of Serbs, Croats and Slovenes at the 1924 and 1928 Summer Olympics.

Club career
He won three club titles, two with Građanski in 1923 and 1928 and one with Concordia in 1930.

International career
He made his debut for Yugoslavia in an October 1921 friendly match against Czechoslovakia and earned a total of 11 caps (scoring 2 goals) and playing in all positions, though he was known as a striker. His final international was a March 1931 Balkan Cup match against Greece.

References

External links
 
Profile at FIFA
Biography of Dragutin Babić 

1897 births
1945 deaths
Footballers from Zagreb
People from the Kingdom of Croatia-Slavonia
Association football defenders
Croatian footballers
Yugoslav footballers
Yugoslavia international footballers
Olympic footballers of Yugoslavia
Footballers at the 1924 Summer Olympics
Footballers at the 1928 Summer Olympics
HŠK Građanski Zagreb players
HŠK Concordia players
Yugoslav First League players
People executed by Yugoslavia
Executed Croatian people